The following highways are numbered 261:

Asia

Japan
 Japan National Route 261

Malaysia
 Malaysia Federal Route 261

Europe

Germany
 Bundesautobahn 261

Norway
 Norwegian County Road 261

Poland
 European route E261

North America

Canada
 Prince Edward Island Route 261
 Quebec Route 261

Mexico
 Mexican Federal Highway 261

United States
 Alabama State Route 261
 Arizona State Route 261
 California State Route 261
 Delaware Route 261
 Florida State Road 261
 Georgia State Route 261 (former)
 Indiana State Road 261
 Kansas state highway spur K-261
 Kentucky Route 261
 Maryland Route 261
 Minnesota State Highway 261
 New Mexico State Road 261
 New York State Route 261
 County Route 261 in Erie County
 North Carolina Highway 261
 Ohio State Route 261
 Oregon Route 238
 Pennsylvania Route 261
 South Carolina Highway 261
 Tennessee State Route 261
 Texas State Highway 261
 Texas State Highway Spur 261
 Farm to Market Road 261
 Utah State Route 261
 Virginia State Route 261
 Washington State Route 261

South America

Brazil
 SP-261

See also
 Milwaukee Road 261, a steam locomotive